The 1999 UCI Road World Cup was the eleventh edition of the UCI Road World Cup. It was won by Belgian classics specialist Andrei Tchmil.

Races

Final standings

Individual

Team

References

External links
Complete results from Cyclingbase.com
 Final classification for individuals and teams from memoire-du-cyclisme.eu

 
 
UCI Road World Cup (men)